Mandal is a town and tehsil  in Bhilwara District of Rajasthan State, India. It belongs to Ajmer Division.

Location
It s located 13 KM towards North from District head quarters Bhilwara. It is a Tehsil head quarter.

Bhilwara district came into existence in 1949, which constituted the merger of the Banera and Badnor chieftainships of Mewar State with Mandalgarh and Shahpura Thikana.

Notes and references

Cities and towns in Bhilwara district